The 2002 World Series was the championship series of Major League Baseball (MLB)'s 2002 season. The 98th edition of the World Series, it was a best-of-seven playoff between the American League (AL) champion Anaheim Angels and the National League (NL) champion San Francisco Giants; the Angels defeated the Giants, four games to three, to win their first, and, to date, only World Series championship. The series was played from October 19–27, 2002, at Pacific Bell Park in San Francisco and Edison International Field of Anaheim in Anaheim.

This was the first World Series since the 1995 inception of the wild card in MLB (and the last until ) in which both wild card teams would vie for the title. The Angels finished the regular season in second place in the AL West division. They defeated the four-time defending AL champion New York Yankees, three games to one, in the best-of-five AL Division Series, and in doing so won their first postseason series in franchise history. They then defeated the Minnesota Twins, four games to one, in the best-of-seven AL Championship Series to advance to the World Series, another first in franchise history. The Giants finished the regular season in second place in the NL West division. They defeated the Atlanta Braves in the NL Division Series and the St. Louis Cardinals in the NL Championship Series to advance to the World Series, giving the team their 20th NL pennant and 17th appearance in the Fall Classic but only their third since moving from New York City to San Francisco in 1958.

Barry Bonds, Reggie Sanders, and J. T. Snow each hit home runs to help propel the Giants to win Game one. Game two was a high-scoring affair that the Angels ultimately won on Tim Salmon's eighth-inning home run. The Angels routed the Giants in Game three, but lost Game four on a tie-breaking eighth-inning single by the Giants' David Bell. The Giants brought the Angels to the brink of elimination by winning Game five in a blowout. The Giants were eight outs away from winning the Series in Game six, but late game home runs by Scott Spiezio and Darin Erstad, as well as a two-RBI double by Troy Glaus helped the Angels overcome a five-run, seventh-inning deficit to win. A three-run double by Garret Anderson was the difference in the Angels' Game seven win to clinch the series. Glaus was named the World Series Most Valuable Player. The two teams set a record for combined most home runs in a World Series (21), which stood until 2017.

Background

This was the fourth World Series played between two teams from California and the last World Series as of today involving two teams from the same state (since 2000 between cross-town rivals Mets & Yankees). The 1974 World Series saw the Oakland Athletics defeat the Los Angeles Dodgers; the  series saw the Dodgers getting revenge by defeating the Athletics. In  the San Francisco Giants were defeated by the Oakland Athletics. This was the first World Series to feature opposing managers who had been teammates on a World Championship team as players.

San Francisco Giants

Since their 1958 move from New York City to San Francisco, the Giants franchise and its fans had a long history of futility, frustration, and disappointment. Since the move, the Giants made it to the Series twice but lost both times. These included a dramatic, down-to-the-wire loss to the New York Yankees in the seven-game classic 1962 World Series, and a four-game sweep by their crosstown rival Oakland Athletics in the 1989 World Series that was marred by the Loma Prieta earthquake. Their most recent postseason appearance was in 2000, when they were defeated by the New York Mets in the NLDS. In addition, the Giants narrowly missed winning the N.L. pennant in 1959, 1964, 1965 and 1966. They finished in second place five years in a row from 1965–1969 and lost the 1971 NLCS to the Pittsburgh Pirates.

2002 was Dusty Baker's tenth season as manager of the Giants. It was also their third season playing at Pacific Bell Park (now Oracle Park). The Giants finished the previous season with a record of 90–72, finishing in second place in the NL West, two games behind the Arizona Diamondbacks. They also finished in second place in the NL wild card standings, three games behind the St. Louis Cardinals. Notable player departures included 2001 midseason acquisition Andrés Galarraga, who departed as a free agent, and Shawn Estes, who was traded to the New York Mets in exchange for Tsuyoshi Shinjo and Desi Relaford. Notable player acquisitions included Reggie Sanders, a free agent, and David Bell, who the Giants received from the Seattle Mariners in exchange for Desi Relaford and cash. During the season the Giants also acquired Kenny Lofton from the Chicago White Sox in exchange for two minor leaguers. Sanders, Bell, Shinjo, and Lofton helped bolster a Giants offense led by longtime Giants Barry Bonds, J. T. Snow, Rich Aurilia, and Jeff Kent, as well as relative newcomer Benito Santiago. The starting pitching rotation was led by Kirk Rueter and Jason Schmidt, with a bullpen led by Tim Worrell and closer Robb Nen.

During the 2002 regular season, the Giants led the NL West standings for most of April and a few days in May; however, by the end of May they had fallen to third place behind the Los Angeles Dodgers and Arizona Diamondbacks. They spent most of the next three months in third place, but on September 9 they took second place for good, while the Dodgers either tied them or fell to third place for the rest of the season. The Giants finished the regular season with a record of 95–66,  games behind the NL West champion Diamondbacks. They won the NL wild card,  games ahead of the runner-up Dodgers.

In the 2002 postseason, the wild-card Giants' first opponent was the top-seeded Atlanta Braves, who they defeated in five games to return to the NLCS for the first time since 1989. In the NLCS, the Giants defeated the #3 seed St. Louis Cardinals in five games to advance to the World Series for the 17th time in franchise history.

This was Giants' outfielder Reggie Sanders' second consecutive World Series appearance with different teams—in  he got there with the Arizona Diamondbacks.

Anaheim Angels

Like the Giants, the Angels and their fans carried a long history of futility and disappointment. Enfranchised in 1961, the Angels had never before played in the World Series. They came close several times, including ALCS losses in 1979 to the Baltimore Orioles, 1982 to the Milwaukee Brewers, and in 1986 to the Boston Red Sox. After dropping the 1979 ALCS in four games, the Angels brought their opponents to the brink of elimination in each of those last two series, before losing the next three consecutive games and the series. The 1986 ALCS, in which the Angels were as close as 1 strike away from the World Series, was the Angels' latest postseason appearance, though they came close in 1995 when they lost a one-game tie-breaker for the AL West championship to the Seattle Mariners after blowing a 14-game lead in the standings.

2002 was the Angels' third season under manager Mike Scioscia. The Angels finished the previous injury marred season with a record of 75–87, finishing in third place in the AL West. The most notable personnel change during the offseason was the trade of first baseman Mo Vaughn to the New York Mets in exchange for pitcher Kevin Appier. Offensively, the team was led by longtime Angels Garret Anderson, Darin Erstad, Troy Glaus and Tim Salmon, as well as relative newcomers Adam Kennedy and David Eckstein. The starting pitching rotation was led by Ramón Ortiz and Jarrod Washburn, as well as mid-season call-up John Lackey, while the bullpen was led by setup man Brendan Donnelly and closer Troy Percival. The bullpen was bolstered in late September by the addition of 20-year-old reliever prospect Francisco Rodriguez.

The Angels spent much of the season trailing the first-place Seattle Mariners and on occasion the Oakland Athletics in the AL West standings. However, the A's and Angels both mounted late-season comebacks that, coupled with a poor August record for the Mariners, knocked the Mariners down to third place. The A's won 20 straight games at one point, and the Angels finished the season in second place with a 99–63 record, four games behind the A's, but won the AL wild card, six games ahead of the Boston Red Sox and Seattle Mariners. Their 99 wins was third best in the A.L. and fourth best in baseball.

In the 2002 postseason, the wild-card Angels first faced off against the overall #1 seed and four-time defending American League champion New York Yankees in the ALDS. The Angels shocked the four-time defending AL champions in four games to return to the ALCS for the first time since 1986. Their opponent in the ALCS was the third-seeded Minnesota Twins, who they defeated in five games to advance to the World Series for the first time in franchise history.

Summary

Matchups

Game 1

San Francisco won 4–3 at Edison International Field of Anaheim (now Angel Stadium of Anaheim) to take a 1–0 series lead. As he strode into the batter's box to open the second inning, Barry Bonds was finally making his first (and only) World Series appearance; in his first at bat on a 2–1 pitch from Angels starter Jarrod Washburn, Bonds smoked a line drive for a home run to right field, which gave the Giants a quick 1–0 lead. Reggie Sanders then followed that up with an opposite-field homer later in the inning. With the Giants leading 2–1 in the fifth, Giants batter J. T. Snow (who formerly played for the Angels) hit a two-run shot over the center field wall after Sanders singled to give San Francisco a three-run advantage. Eventual Series MVP Troy Glaus hit two home runs for the Angels, one in the second and another in the sixth off Giants starter Jason Schmidt. Adam Kennedy drove in a run with a base hit in the sixth as well to trim the deficit to 4–3. However, Schmidt was effective otherwise, along with reliever Félix Rodríguez and closer Robb Nen, as they held off the Halos the rest of the way.

Game 2

Game 2 was a slugfest that saw the lead fluctuate wildly between the two teams. The Angels plated five runs in the first inning by batting around against Giants starting pitcher Russ Ortiz. David Eckstein singled to lead off and scored on Darin Erstad's double. After Tim Salmon singled, Garret Anderson's RBI single made it 2–0 Angels. After Troy Glaus flew out, consecutive RBI singles by Brad Fullmer and Scott Spiezio made it 4–0 Angels. Fullmer stole home plate for the Angels' fifth run of the inning.

In the second inning, however, Kevin Appier surrendered most of the lead by allowing a three-run homer to Sanders followed by a shot to David Bell. The Angels answered with a two-run home run from veteran Tim Salmon to make it 7–4 in the Angels' favor. Ortiz would not finish the inning and was relieved by Chad Zerbe, who provided four innings of relief.

Appier did not last much longer than Ortiz, as he was pulled in the third and replaced by John Lackey, the Angels scheduled starter for Game 4, after surrendering a lead-off home run to Jeff Kent. Lackey temporarily quieted the Giants' offense but ran into trouble in the fifth inning, allowing a double and intentional walk. Ben Weber relieved him but allowed a single to Benito Santiago to load the bases, then a two-run single to J. T. Snow that tied the game. After Reggie Sanders struck out, consecutive RBI singles by David Bell and Shawon Dunston gave the Giants a 9–7 lead.

The Angels turned to 20-year-old rookie reliever Francisco Rodriguez, who answered by shutting down the Giants offense for the next three innings. He retired nine batters in a row on 25 pitches (22 were strikes). Meanwhile, the Angels chipped away at their deficit. In the bottom of the fifth, Glaus and Fullmer hit back-to-back leadoff singles before the former scored on Spezio's sacrifice fly. Next inning, Erstad doubled with two outs. Zerbe was relieved by Jay Witasick, who walked Tim Salmon. Aaron Fultz relieved Witasick and allowed an RBI single to Anderson to tie the game, but Salmon was thrown out at third to end the inning.

Salmon drilled a two-run home run with two outs in the eighth inning off of Félix Rodríguez, giving Anaheim an 11–9 lead. Closer Troy Percival retired the first two batters in the ninth, and, after allowing a mammoth shot from Bonds that landed halfway up the right field bleachers, retired Benito Santiago to even the series.
Bonds became the first player since Ted Simmons in the 1982 World Series to hit a home run in his first two World Series games, joining Simmons, Dusty Rhodes in the 1954 World Series and Jimmie Foxx in the 1929 World Series. The feat would later be duplicated by Craig Monroe of the Tigers in the 2006 World Series.

Giants pitchers failed to strike out a batter for the entire game, the first time this had happened in the World Series since Game 7 of the 1960 World Series; as of 2021 it remains the last time a team has not recorded a strikeout in a World Series game.
The Angels won despite giving up four home runs to the Giants, compared to one by the Angels.

Game 3

Anaheim won 10–4 in the first World Series game at Pacific Bell Park (now Oracle Park). The Angels batted around twice without a home run in either of their four-run innings. They became the first team in World Series history to bat around in consecutive innings. Barry Bonds hit another home run, becoming the first player to homer in his first three World Series games.

The Giants struck first on Benito Santiago's based-loaded groundout in the first off of Ramón Ortiz, but Giants starter Liván Hernández walked David Eckstein to lead off the third and allowed a subsequent double to Darin Erstad. An error on Tim Salmon's groundball allowed Eckstein to score. After Garret Anderson flew out, Troy Glaus hit an RBI single and Scott Spiezio followed with a two-run triple. Next inning, Anderson's RBI groundout with runners on second and third chased Hernandez. Jay Witasick entered in relief and walked Glaus before allowing RBI singles to Spiezio, Adam Kennedy and Bengie Molina, which increased Anaheim's lead to 8–1. Rich Aurilia hit a one-out home run in the fifth for the Giants. After Jeff Kent singled, Bonds's home run made it 8–4, but the Giants did not score after that. The Angels added to their lead on Eckstein's RBI single in the sixth off of Aaron Fultz and Erstad's bases-loaded fielder's choice in the eighth off of Scott Eyre.

Giants public address announcer Renel Brooks-Moon is recognized by the Baseball Hall of Fame as the first female announcer of a championship game in any professional sport for her role in the 2002 World Series. Her scorecard from Game 3 is on display in the National Baseball Hall of Fame and Museum in Cooperstown, New York. Until 2014, this game was the Giants' only World Series loss at home since Pacific Bell Park opened in 2000. They proceeded to win the final two games in this series, then won four straight home games in their next two World Series appearances in 2010 and 2012 until finally losing at home in Game 3 in 2014.

Game 4

The Angels struck first in the second on David Eckstein's bases-loaded sacrifice fly, then made it 3–0 next inning on Troy Glaus's two-run home run off of starter Kirk Rueter. In the bottom of the fifth, however, Angels starter John Lackey allowed three consecutive leadoff singles, the last of which by Rich Aurilia scoring Rueter. Jeff Kent's sacrifice fly cut the Angels' lead to 3–2 and NLCS MVP Benito Santiago tied the game with a single in after the Angels walked Barry Bonds with a runner on second and two outs. David Bell put the Giants ahead with an RBI single in the bottom of the eighth off of Francisco Rodriguez. The run was unearned, due to Anaheim catcher Bengie Molina's passed ball during the previous at-bat, allowing J. T. Snow to move to second. Tim Worrell got the win for the Giants. San Francisco scored a 4–3 victory to tie the series and ensured a return trip to Anaheim.

Game 5

San Francisco took a 16–4 blowout win in a game in which the Angels never led. The most well-known moment in this game occurred in the bottom of the seventh when Giants first baseman J. T. Snow scored off a Kenny Lofton triple. Three-year-old batboy Darren, son of Giants manager Dusty Baker, ran to home plate to collect Lofton's bat before the play was completed and was quickly lifted by the jacket by Snow with one hand as he crossed the plate, with David Bell close on his heels. Had Snow not acted quickly, Darren could have been seriously injured in a play at home plate.

Giants' second-baseman Jeff Kent hit two home runs to break out of a slump (hitting his first home run since Game 2), driving in four runs.

In the bottom of the first, Barry Bonds's double off of Jarrod Washburn with runners on first and second gave the Giants an early lead. Benito Santiago's sacrifice fly, followed by three consecutive walks made it 3–0 Giants. Next inning, Benito's bases-loaded single scored two and Reggie Sanders's sacrifice fly scored another. Orlando Palmeiro doubled to lead off the top of the fifth, moved to third on David Eckstein's single and scored on Darin Erstad's sacrifice fly. After Tim Salmon singled, a wild pitch by starter Jason Schmidt allowed Eckstein to score. After Garret Anderson struck out, Troy Glaus's RBI double cut the Giants' lead to 6–3. The Angels cut it to 6–4 next inning off of Chad Zerbe on Eckstein's groundout with runners on second and third, but did not score again. Kent's two-run home run in the bottom half off of Ben Weber widened the Giants' lead to 8–4. Next inning, Kenny Lofton's two-run triple made it 10–4 Giants. Scot Shields relieved Weber and after Aurilia struck out, Kent's second home run of the game made it 12–4 Giants. Next inning, Shields allowed consecutive one-out singles to J. T. Snow and David Bell, then an error on Tsuyoshi Shinjo's ground ball made it 13–4 Giants. After Lofton grounded out, Aurilia capped the scoring with a three-run home run. Scott Eyre retired the Angels in order in the ninth as the Giants were one win away from a World Series title. Chad Zerbe earned the win for the Giants.

This game shares one peculiar record with Game 2 of the 1960 World Series. The two games share the World Series record for most runs scored by a game winning team who ultimately went on to lose the series.

Game 6

The turning point in the Series came in Game 6. Following the top of the seventh inning, the Giants led 5–0 but then proceeded to surrender three runs in the bottom of the inning and another three runs in the bottom of the eighth inning and lost the game 6–5.

The game was scoreless through the first four innings.  In the top of the fifth, San Francisco took the lead. David Bell singled with one out, then Shawon Dunston's home run made it 2–0 Giants.  After Kenny Lofton doubled, Francisco Rodríguez relieved Kevin Appier.  Lofton stole third and scored on a wild pitch.  In the top of the sixth, Barry Bonds homered off Rodriguez to make it 4–0, and the Giants added another run in the top of the seventh when Lofton singled and stole second and was driven in by a single by Jeff Kent.

Leading 5–0 with one out in the bottom of the seventh inning, eight outs away from the Giants' first World Series title since moving to San Francisco in 1958, Giants manager Dusty Baker pulled starting pitcher Russ Ortiz, who had shut out the Angels during the game, for setup man Félix Rodríguez after Ortiz gave up consecutive singles to third baseman Troy Glaus and designated hitter Brad Fullmer. In a move noted in later years, Baker gave Ortiz the game ball as he sent him back to the dugout, as Ortiz wanted a souvenir ball (contrary to some belief, the Angels did not see the move in real time). During the pitching change the Rally Monkey came on the JumboTron, sending 45,037 Angels fans into a frenzy.

Angels first baseman Scott Spiezio then fouled off pitch after pitch before finally hitting a three-run home run that barely cleared the wall in right field. Ortiz would be charged with two runs and a no-decision, his second of the series.  The rally continued in the eighth inning, as Angels center fielder Darin Erstad hit a leadoff line-drive home run, followed by consecutive singles by Tim Salmon and Garret Anderson.  When Bonds misplayed Anderson's shallow left field bloop single, Chone Figgins (who had pinch-run for Salmon) and Anderson took third and second base, respectively.  With no outs, two runners in scoring position and now only a 5–4 lead, Baker brought in closer Robb Nen to pitch to Glaus, hoping that Nen could induce a strikeout that might yet preserve the Giants' slim lead; prior to that game, he was seven of seven in postseason saves that year despite dealing with a shoulder injury. However, Glaus slugged a double to the left-center field gap over Bonds' head to drive in the tying and go-ahead runs and giving Nen a blown save. Nen managed to keep Glaus from scoring before leaving the game, which ended up being his final appearance as a major league player.

In the ninth inning, Angels closer Troy Percival struck out Tom Goodwin, induced a foul popout from Lofton, and struck out Rich Aurilia to preserve the 6–5 victory in front of the jubilant home crowd.  The comeback from a five-run deficit was the largest in World Series history for an elimination game. The next time a team overcame a 5 run defict to win the game and it turned out to be 6-5 was in Game 1 of the 2022 World Series when the Phillies did so against the Astros. That team like the Giants was managed by Dusty Baker.

Game 7

Game 7 proved to be somewhat anticlimactic after the drama of Game 6. The Giants scored the first run in the top of the second inning when Reggie Sanders hit a sacrifice fly to score Benito Santiago from third, but the Angels responded with a run-scoring double from catcher Bengie Molina that scored Scott Spiezio from first after he had walked with two outs. A three-run double to right field from left fielder Garret Anderson pushed the lead to a 4–1 lead and gave San Francisco starter Liván Hernández the loss. Hernández was yanked following Anderson's double, and Chad Zerbe got out of the nightmarish inning. Zerbe, Kirk Rueter, and Tim Worrell held the Angels scoreless, but it was not enough. Rookie starting pitcher John Lackey maintained that lead through five innings, and turned the game over to the strong Angels bullpen. In the ninth inning, closer Troy Percival provided some tense moments as he opened the inning by putting two Giants players on base, with only one out. But Tsuyoshi Shinjo—the first Japanese-born player in a World Series game—struck out swinging, and Kenny Lofton, also representing the tying run, flied out to Darin Erstad in right-center field to end the Series. The Angels won Game 7, 4–1, to claim their franchise's first and only World Series championship to date. John Lackey became the first rookie pitcher to win a World Series Game 7 since 1909. In Game 7, three rookie pitchers (John Lackey, Brendan Donnelly, and Francisco Rodríguez) combined to throw eight innings while only giving up one run combined.

The Angels won the World Series despite scoring fewer runs (41) than the Giants (44). The Angels lost the first game in all three rounds of the playoffs (Division Series, League Championship Series, and World Series), yet rebounded to win each time. They were the first, and to date only, team to do this since the new postseason format was created in 1994.

Until 2017, this was the last time a franchise would win its first World Series title. It was also the second year in a row that the feat had been accomplished; in 2001, the Diamondbacks beat the Yankees in just their fourth year of existence. Also in those two years, both teams won the World Series in just their first appearance, which did not happen again until 2019, when the Washington Nationals would accomplish the feat.

The Angels became the first American League (AL) champion team not representing the AL East Division to win the World Series since the Minnesota Twins in 1991. The Angels were also the first American League Wild Card winner to win the World Series. With this win the Angels got rid of the supposed curse on their head stemming from Anaheim Stadium being built on an ancient Indian burial ground.

This was Dusty Baker's final game as manager of the Giants, as he left to become manager of the Chicago Cubs in the offseason.

Composite box
2002 World Series (4–3): Anaheim Angels (A.L.) over San Francisco Giants (N.L.)

Impact and aftermath

The Angels and the Giants combined to log 85 runs over the course of the series, the largest combined run total for both teams in World Series history.  This remains the most recent World Series that was played entirely within one state. There would not be another postseason match-up between two California teams until the 2020 National League Division Series between the Los Angeles Dodgers and San Diego Padres, which took place at neutral site (Globe Life Field in Texas) due to the COVID-19 outbreak.

This was the last World Series where home-field advantage alternated between the National and American Leagues each year. As a result of the tie in the 2002 All-Star Game, beginning in 2003 home-field advantage in the World Series was controversially granted to the league that won the All-Star Game. That practice ended after the  2016 Series; beginning in 2017, the team with the best regular season record will enjoy home field advantage, the same format used in the National Basketball Association's Finals and National Hockey League's Stanley Cup Finals.

This is currently the earliest World Series in which no personnel from either team have been elected to the National Baseball Hall of Fame.

Angels
Just before the start of the 2003 season,  the Walt Disney Company sold the Angels for $180 million to business man Arte Moreno. Nevertheless, the 2002 World Series win began the most successful era in Angels franchise history, making six postseason appearances from 2002–2009. Before 2002, they had been to the postseason three times in franchise history (1979, 1982, and 1986). They advanced to the ALCS in 2005 and 2009, but lost those series respectively to the Chicago White Sox and New York Yankees, each while en route to their own World Series championship.

The 2002 Series run would be the highpoint of the Angels run with Mike Scioscia as manager. From 2002 to 2009, the Angels would make the playoffs six times. They advanced to the American League Championship Series two further times (2005, 2009), losing twice. After one further appearance in 2014, the Angels fired Scioscia in 2018.

The Angels would sparingly use the Rally Monkey mascot after the 2002 World Series and unofficially retired it after the 2009 postseason.

Both David Eckstein and Scott Spiezio later played for the  St. Louis Cardinals world championship team. Eckstein and Spiezio played alongside Yadier Molina, younger brother of Bengie and José Molina, on the Cardinals. José later won a second World Series title with the  Yankees, while John Lackey added two World Series rings with the  Boston Red Sox and  Chicago Cubs.

Giants
Game 7 of the series was Dusty Baker's final game as manager of the Giants, as he left in the offseason to take the same position with the Cubs due to disagreements with ownership. Game 7 was also Jeff Kent's last game in San Francisco, as he signed a free-agent contract to play for the Houston Astros during the off-season. The departure of manager Baker, a season-long feud with Barry Bonds and a desire to be closer to his family's Texas ranch factored into Kent's eventual decision to leave the Giants. He retired as the all-time leader in home runs as a second baseman. The 2000 MVP would inducted into the San Francisco Giants Wall of Fame in 2009. 

The Giants would return to the postseason the following season under new manager Felipe Alou with a 100 win season (the first time in ten years), but they would lose in the NLDS to the Florida Marlins, a Wild Card team that later won the World Series championship. After a second-place finish in 2004, the Giants had losing seasons for the next four years, and they replaced Alou with Bruce Bochy in 2007. After losing 90 games in 2008, the Giants won 88 games for a surprising third-place finish in 2009. Building on their 2009 season, the Giants returned to the postseason in 2010 as a Divisional Winner team, defeating the Braves in the NLDS, and the Phillies in the NLCS en route to the World Series, where they defeated the Rangers in five games, earning the long-awaited championship they could not reach in 2002. In 2012, after fighting back from down two games to none in the NLDS against the Cincinnati Reds (led by Baker) and down three games to one against the defending World Series Champions, the St. Louis Cardinals in the NLCS, they swept the Detroit Tigers for their second World Series Championship in three years. In 2014, the Giants added their third title in five seasons by defeating the Kansas City Royals in seven games.

Of the players from the 2002 Giants (excluding previous World Series champions Liván Hernández, Robb Nen and Reggie Sanders), only Scott Eyre and Pedro Feliz went on to win a World Series ring with another team. Eyre and Feliz became teammates on the 2008 Philadelphia Phillies world championship team. By the time San Francisco won their first World Series in 2010, there were no members on the from the 2002 squad on that team.

Barry Bonds
In terms of personal accolades, Barry Bonds would break Hank Aaron's all-time homerun record in 2007. Bonds also won two more National League MVPs in 2003 and 2004, extending his record for most MVP Awards to seven. Bonds would enter free agency at the end of the 2007 season for the first time since coming over from Pittsburg to San Francisco in 1993, but there were no teams interested in signing him. Bonds would not play another major league game after the 2007 season. He retired as one of the greatest players in MLB history to never to win a championship, along with Ted Williams and Ty Cobb. 

Bonds' last few seasons and his post-playing career would be mired due to performance enhancing drugs allegations. The only way  Bonds could make the National Baseball Hall of Fame would be through the Veterans Committee, as he lost out to David Ortiz in the 2022 ballot, his 10th and final one. This was met with negative reaction from some fans, as fans complained that Ortiz had made the Hall of Fame, despite testing positive for PEDs in 2003, whilst Bonds never tested positive for any PEDs.

Dusty Baker
Baker received great fan ire for his decision to pull Russ Ortiz in Game 6 with a 5-0 lead and just a few more outs away from clinching San Francisco's first World Series in the city.

Baker would serve as the manager for the Chicago Cubs in 2003 after mutually parting ways in San Francisco. As with the Giants, he would help break a postseason drought, as he led them to a series victory in the 2003 National League Division Series over Atlanta, the first postseason series victory in 95 years for Chicago. However, they would lose in the 2003 National League Championship Series to the Florida Marlins when they were five outs from clinching a pennant in Game 6. This was the first of a long line of postseason futility for Baker, who went to the postseason five further times in his next eleven seasons as a manager but failed to win a single series. In 2020, he was hired to manage the Houston Astros. He broke his postseason drought with the team by winning in the Wild Card Series that year (2020) and then returned to the World Series the following year (where they ultimately lost to Atlanta in six games) after winning the 2021 American League Championship Series. In 2022, he finally won a World championship on his third try, defeating Philadelphia in six games to set a new mark of being the manager with the most regular season victories (2,093) before winning their first championship. Russ Ortiz, the pitcher who nearly won Baker a world championship 20 years prior, congratulated Baker is on first championship as manager on Instagram.

MLB Rule Changes
Following the Darren Baker incident in game 5, MLB changed their rules requiring batboys and batgirls be at least 14 years old.

Radio and television
Fox's telecast of this World Series marked the first time the World Series was telecast in high-definition.
Jon Miller, who called this World Series for ESPN Radio, has been play-by-play man for the San Francisco Giants since 1997. Coincidentally, KNBR, the Giants' longtime flagship station, was also San Francisco's ESPN Radio affiliate.
This would be the only World Series called by Angels play-by-play man Rory Markas, who died of a heart attack in January 2010.

Notes

See also
2002 Japan Series

References

External links

 Official MLB.com Coverage

World Series
World Series
Anaheim Angels postseason
San Francisco Giants postseason
Baseball competitions in San Francisco
World Series
21st century in Anaheim, California
2002 in San Francisco
October 2002 sports events in the United States
Baseball competitions in Anaheim, California